The 1982 Hawaii Rainbow Warriors football team represented the University of Hawaiʻi at Mānoa in the Western Athletic Conference during the 1982 NCAA Division I-A football season. In their sixth season under head coach Dick Tomey, the Rainbow Warriors compiled a 6–5 record.

Schedule

References

Hawaii
Hawaii Rainbow Warriors football seasons
Hawaii Rainbow Warriors football